Garbh Eileach is an uninhabited island in the Inner Hebrides of the west coast of Scotland. It is the largest of the Garvellachs and lies in the Firth of Lorne between Mull and Argyll.

The name is Gaelic for "rough rock". The Anglicised version of the name gives the whole group of islands its name, the Garvellachs.

There is a small ruined fort above a bay on the eastern coast.

Footnotes

References

External links

Uninhabited islands of Argyll and Bute